Rhodiola rhodantha, common name redpod stonecrop or queen's crown, is a perennial flowering plant in the family Crassulaceae.

Distribution

This species is present in the United States (Arizona, Colorado, Montana, New Mexico, Utah, and Wyoming).

Description
These plants have small, lanceolate and succulent leaves without petiole. They are green at the bottom of the plant whereas at the top they are reddish. The flowers are hermaphrodite, may be rose or reddish and form an inflorescence. They bloom from July to August and the seeds ripen from August to September.

References

External links 

Crassulaceae